Goodbye Again may refer to:

Books

Goodbye, Again, a 2021 essay collection by Jonny Sun

Film
 Goodbye Again (1933 film), directed by Michael Curtiz, starring Warren William and Joan Blondell
 Goodbye Again, a 1928 play written by George Haight and Allan Scott, on which the film was based
 Goodbye Again (1961 film), directed by Anatole Litvak, featuring Ingrid Bergman, Yves Montand and Anthony Perkins
 Goodbye Again (TV series), a 1968 TV series with Peter Cook and Dudley Moore

Music
 "Goodbye Again", a 1972 song by John Denver from the album Rocky Mountain High
 "Goodbye Again", a 2003 song by Vertical Horizon from the album Go